Huadian is a city in south-central Jilin province, People's Republic of China. It is under the administration of the prefecture-level city of Jilin City.

Administrative divisions

Subdistricts:
Minghua Subdistrict, Yongji Subdistrict, Shengli Subdistrict, Qixin Subdistrict, Xinhua Subdistrict

Towns:
Hongshi, Baishan, Jiapigou, Erdaodianzi, Badaohezi, Yumuqiaozi, Laojinchang, Changshan

Townships:
Gongji Township, Huajiao Township, Jinsha Township, Huashulinzi Township, Huanan Township, Sumigou Township, Beitaizi Township, Hengdaohezi Township

Climate
Huadian has a four-season, monsoon-influenced, humid continental climate (Köppen Dwa). Spring and autumn are somewhat short transitional periods, with some precipitation, but are usually dry and windy. Summers are hot and humid, with a prevailing southeasterly wind due to the East Asian monsoon; July averages . Snow is usually light during the winter, and annual rainfall is heavily concentrated from June to August.

References

External links
Official website of Huadian Government

Cities in Jilin
County-level divisions of Jilin
Jilin City